Thomas Jefferson McKean (August 21, 1810 – April 19, 1870) was an American engineer, soldier, politician, and farmer. A West Point graduate, he fought in the United States Army during the Seminole Wars, in the Mexican–American War, and he served as a general in the Union Army during the American Civil War.

Early life and career
Thomas J. McKean was born in 1810 in the borough of Burlington located in Bradford County, Pennsylvania. He entered the United States Military Academy in West Point in 1827, and graduated four years later, standing 19th out of 33 cadets. McKean was commissioned a brevet second lieutenant in the 4th U.S. Infantry on July 1, 1831. His service in the U.S. Army consisted of several stints of garrison duty over the next three years, during which he was promoted to second lieutenant on September 15, 1833. McKean resigned from the U.S. Army the following year on March 31.

After resigning in 1834, McKean took up work as a civil engineer. He then participated in the Seminole Wars in 1837–38, serving as adjutant of the 1st Pennsylvania Volunteers, with the rank of first lieutenant. McKean resigned on March 31, 1838, and returned to Pennsylvania and the profession of an engineer. In 1840 he relocated to Marion in the Iowa Territory, and in 1844 he was part of the constitutional convention aimed at creating the state of Iowa.

During the Mexican–American War, McKean volunteered for service, and enlisted as a private in the 15th U.S. Infantry on April 12, 1847. He was quickly promoted to sergeant major on May 10, and fought in the Battle of Churubusco on August 20, in which he was wounded. That June, McKean was appointed to the rank of brevet second lieutenant in the 2nd U.S. Dragoons, but he chose to decline the commission. After hostilities ended, he was discharged on August 7, 1848. Historian Ezra J. Warner noted McKean's unusual situation of having been trained at West Point and served in other duties as an officer, but was as an enlisted man in combat while in Mexico. Following the war he returned to his civilian life in Iowa, a U.S. state since 1846.

Civil War service

When the American Civil War began in 1861, McKean chose to follow his home state and the Union cause. On June 1 he was appointed the paymaster of the Union Army, and then led the cavalry of the Department of the Gulf beginning on September 18. McKean was briefly in charge of prisoner of war camps in Missouri, and was appointed a brigadier general in the Union Army on November 21.

McKean commanded at Jefferson City, Missouri, from December to March 1862. He was then given divisional command in the Army of the Tennessee on April 10. He fought in the Battle of Corinth in Mississippi on October 3–4, and then led his division until December 9. McKean then commanded numerous districts across Union-held departments throughout 1863, 1864, and until July 10, 1865. McKean was appointed to the rank of brevet major general on March 13 for his war service, and was mustered out of the volunteer service on August 24.

Postbellum
After the American Civil War ended in 1865, McKean returned home to Iowa. He was elected Marion's mayor that year, and took up farming close to the city until 1869. He served as a delegate to the Republican convention in Chicago, Illinois, in 1868. McKean was offered the position of pension agent of the eastern Iowa district in early 1870, but he declined it.  That April he died in Marion, Iowa, and was buried in the city's Oak Shade Cemetery.

See also

List of American Civil War generals (Union)

Notes

References
 Eicher, John H., and Eicher, David J., Civil War High Commands, Stanford University Press, 2001, .
 Warner, Ezra J., Generals in Blue: The Lives of the Union Commanders, Louisiana State University Press, 1964, .

External links

1810 births
1870 deaths
American military personnel of the Mexican–American War
People of Pennsylvania in the American Civil War
People of Iowa in the American Civil War
Union Army generals
United States Military Academy alumni
Mayors of places in Iowa
People from Marion, Iowa
19th-century American politicians